"Step Up" is a song by Swedish singer Darin, released in September 2005 as the lead single from his second album, Darin.  The song was co-written by Darin with RedOne and Bilal Hajji and debuted at number one.

Music video
The video has a very R&B theme to it featuring Darin singing through a broken window in front of green strobe lights similar to that of Yeah! by U.S. singer Usher. Darin is seen with his dancers performing in front of a wall of graffiti in a basement style setting where there also is a crowded party, with Darin being seen dancing in the crowd. In the video there is a wall with a picture of Darin painted on it, in front of which he is seen singing. The video is produced and directed by Mikedalica and Harakiri, and is featured on the DVD Tour Videos Interview.

Track listing
 "Step Up" -3:07
 "Step Up" (Instrumental) -3:07

Charts

Weekly charts

Year-end charts

Certifications

Notes
"Step Up" was heard playing in a club in episode 5 of the third series of UK comedy Benidorm on 30 October 2009. There is also an unofficial remix of the song mixed with the song Just a Lil Bit by rapper 50 Cent. The song has furthermore been covered by German boy band Part Six.

References

2005 singles
Darin (singer) songs
Number-one singles in Sweden
Columbia Records singles
Songs written by RedOne
Song recordings produced by RedOne
Songs written by Darin (singer)
Songs written by Bilal Hajji
2005 songs